Justin Lance Lee is an Australian public servant, currently serving as High Commissioner to Malaysia since July 2021. Lee was the Australian Ambassador for Climate Change between 2012 and 2014. after having served as Australia's
High Commissioner to Bangladesh between 2008 and 2012. Lee served as deputy head of mission to Indonesia from 2015 to 2017.

Lee joined the Australian Department of Foreign Affairs and Trade (DFAT) in 1995 and is a career foreign service officer. His positions in DFAT include Assistant Secretary of the Consular Policy Branch and he has previously been posted to Australia's diplomatic missions in Jakarta (2005–08) and Port Moresby (1999-2001).

Lee represented Australia at the 2013 United Nations Climate Change Conference.

Lee holds a BA (Jur.) (Hons) and was awarded a PhD in Development Geography from the University of Adelaide for research on the Sumba Island of Indonesia.

References

Living people
Australian diplomats
University of Adelaide alumni
High Commissioners of Australia to Bangladesh
High Commissioners of Australia to Malaysia
Year of birth missing (living people)